Sankara Nethralaya is a not-for-profit missionary institution for ophthalmic care (i.e., an eye hospital) headquartered in Chennai, India. In the name "Sankara Nethralaya", "Sankara" is a reference to Lord Shiva and "Nethralaya" means "The Temple of the Eye". Sankara Nethralaya receives patients from India and abroad. Sankara Nethralaya has over 1000 employees and serves around 1500 patients per day, performing over 100 surgeries per day. The annual revenue as per the taxes is close to US$100 million.

Sankara Nethralaya was rated among the top four ophthalmic institutions worldwide in 2020 by Newsweek.  Nani A. Palkivala, former Indian ambassador to United States, described Sankara Nethralaya as the "Best managed charitable organization in India".

History
In 1976 when addressing a group of doctors, Sri Jayendra Saraswathi, the Sankaracharya of the Kanchi Kamakoti Peetam spoke of the need to create a hospital. Under the leadership of Sengamedu Srinivasa Badrinath, a group of philanthropists founded a charitable not-for-profit eye hospital.

On Vinayaka Chaturthi, 6 September 1978, considered an auspicious day, the hospital came into existence. It was named Sankara Nethralaya, which means "The Temple of the Eye". In a function held at the premises of the Vijaya Hospital with Semmangudi Srinivasa Aiyer offering the prayer, T. Agarwal inaugurated the project.

Currently, Sankara Nethralaya has five locations in Chennai and has services at Mukundapur in Kolkata, Rameshwaram and Tirupati in Andhra Pradesh, Guwahati in Assam and has plans to expand in more states and possibly other countries.

Sankara Nethralaya has various fellowships in ophthalmology such as vitreo retina, glaucoma, cornea, and so forth and also has various fellowships and certificate courses in optometry such as binocular vision, vision therapy, contact lens, low vision, and so forth.

Bachelor of Optometry (B.Optom) courses are run here in collaboration with SASTRA University, Tanjavur.

B.Sc. and M.Sc. in Medical Laboratory Technology (MLT), Master of Optometry (M.Optom) courses are run here affiliated to Tamil Nadu Dr. M.G.R. Medical University, Chennai.

Expansion
Sankara Nethralaya has been branching out very fast recently. Apart from the five centres in Chennai and in Kolkata and Rameswaram, the hospital is now present in Bengaluru, Tirupati, Andhra Pradesh, Jharkhand  as TTD Sri Srinivasa Sankara Nethralaya and mobile eye surgical unit.
The Medical Research Foundation focuses on providing "world-class eye care, community services, research and education -- broadly recognized as the four pillars of the Foundation." In January 2020, it was reported that the hospital collection crossed Rs. 200 crores (Rs 2000 million) for the first time, according to its annual report. In 2018–19, the number of free surgeries in the FY 2018-19 was 22,810—some 36% of total surgeries. It has Mobile Eye Surgery Units in three Indian states—Tamil Nadu, Andhra Pradesh and Jharkhand, which have conducted some 4520 totally free cataract surgeries in different villages across the three states.

Branches

 Sankara Nethralaya Main Campus
 C. U. Shah Sankara Nethralaya
 JKCN
 Navasuja Sankara Nethralaya
 Sankara Nethralaya Super Speciality Clinic (SNSSC)
  Aditya Birla Sankara Nethralaya, Mukundapur, Kolkata 
  kamalnayan Bajaj Sankara Nethralaya, New Town, Kolkata 
 Mobile Eye Surgical Unit, Tatanagar, Jharkhand 
 
 Sankara Nethralaya Optometry Clinic, Olympia Tech Park, Chennai
 Sankara Nethralaya, Rameshwaram
 Sri Srinivasa Sankara Nethralaya, Tirupati

Community ophthalmology
The Jaslok Community Ophthalmic Centre at Sankara Nethralaya offers free services to economically weaker sections.

International patients
Apart from receiving patients from all over the country, Sankara Nethralaya renders service to international patients including the US, UK and Bangladesh. Bangladesh was reported as having topped the number of foreign patients at the Chennai branch of Sankara Nethralaya.
Yearly, some 56,000 Bangladeshi patients arrived in Chennai for eye care at Sankara Nethralaya, accounting for some 60% of all patients in the hospital. The tertiary ophthalmic hospital, provides treatment to patients particularly from South Asia—Sri Lanka, Bangladesh, Afghanistan; Africa—Kenya, Nigeria, South Africa, among other countries; and the Middle East including UAE and Oman.

CU Shah Eye Bank
Sri C U Shah Eye Bank started functioning in Sankara Nethralaya in September 1979. The department of Medical Sociology was established in 1990 with the aim of promoting awareness on eye donation by educating and motivating the public towards this end.

Technology
Sankara Nethralaya was one of the first to implement electronic medical records in its facility with the complete OPD and the procedures done in the OPD available online thereby removing transferring of Records manually between complexes. Very soon electronic medical records will be implemented in the in-patient area. In stem cell research, a collaborative project on corneal stem cells have been underway with Nichi-In Centre for Regenerative Medicine, Chennai (India).

Academics

Ophthalmic course

From its inception in 1978, the C U Shah Ophthalmic Postgraduate Training Center has been offering fellowship programmes in Vitreo-Retinal Surgery and General Ophthalmology to holders of postgraduate degree and a diploma in Ophthalmology. The center (M C I Approved) offers training programmes for graduates in Post graduation in Ophthalmology. The center also conducts the final FRCS Examination (Ophthalmology) of the Royal College of Surgeons (Edinburgh).
In 2016, the Infosys Foundation, which is the philanthropic arm of Indian IT major Infosys, signed a Memorandum of Understanding (MoU) with Sankara Eye Hospitals to set-up a sustainable eye care training academy and undertake research and training activitiesin  eye care.

Courses offered
 Diplomate of National Board of Examination (DNB) Ophthalmology (three years) recognized by the National Board of Examinations
 Diplomate of National Board: Two-year postdoctoral Vitreoretinal fellowship recognized by National Board of Examination
 Fellowship in General Ophthalmology, Cornea, Uvea, Oculoplastis, Glaucoma and, Vitreoretinal. Session starts April and October.
 Cataract Surgery (Basic & Advanced) Sir Ratan Tata two-month fellowship. Session starts January/April/July and October.
 PhD programmes in Ophthalmology, Biochemistry & Microbiology affiliated to Tamil Nadu Dr M G R Medical University, Chennai

Elite School of Optometry (ESO)
The Elite School of Optometry (ESO) is the first and leading college of optometry in India offering a four-year professional degree: B.Optometry.

The college is run by Sankara Nethralaya in collaboration with SASTRA University, Tanjore from the academic year 2017–18. Previously, it functioned in collaboration with Birla Institute of Technology and Science (BITS), Pilani.

Located at close proximity to the Chennai International Airport, Chennai, ESO has a diverse student community coming from states across India. ESO is considered the IIT of optometry in India. The college gives its students a strong academic foundation and excellent clinical training.

Students of ESO have also completed their MS PHD program on a scholarship from various leading universities of different countries. A few work for leading MNCs across the world, while some head the research department of known universities or hospital.

In 2018, the Elite School of Optometry saw eight students received PhD degrees, 32 received their Bachelor of Optometry degree, and award for the Best Optometry of the year 2017 and ESO awards were also distributed. Almost half of the undergraduates were female.

The SN Academy
The Sankara Nethralaya Academy – with a distinctive series of programmes and expert faculty – aims to create a pool of well-trained eye care professionals competent to meet challenges in ophthalmology.

The academy serves as a platform for creating, processing and disseminating knowledge related to eye care, ophthalmic research and hospital administration.

The institution offers wide-ranging programmes including allied health sciences like Optometry (M.Optom, Fellowships and Certificate courses), Ophthalmic Dispensing (B.Sc.), Medical Laboratory Technology (B.Sc. & M.Sc.), Hospital & Healthcare Management (BBA & MBA), Hospital Administration (MHA), etc...

Research

Vision Research Foundation

Vision Research Foundation (VRF) has, over the last two decades, been doing premier work in the areas of ocular infections, cataract, tumours, angiogenesis and genetic basis of eye diseases and pathobiology of other ophthalmic disorders. Scientists working with VRF have developed basic techniques in applied medical biotechnology essential to understand disease processes involved in ophthalmology particularly related to etiopathogenesis and identification of infectious, genetic and malignant disorders. VRF has applied for four patents in Diagnostic Microbiology. One of the patents awarded was on corneal limbal stem cell in vitro expansion  for treating ocular surface disorders jointly with Nichi-In Centre for Regenerative Medicine. Five candidates have been awarded PhD degree and 13 doctoral candidates are registered with Tamil Nadu Dr. MGR Medical University and Birla Institute of Science and Technology, Pilani. The main strength of the group lies in the fact that they work together with ophthalmologists and basic vision scientists, besides having a large clinical resource as patients come from all over India to Sankara Nethralaya.

Vision Research Foundation has research laboratory facilities in the areas of Pathology, Biochemistry, Genetics and Microbiology. The facilities of VRF were located in an old building which has been demolished providing sufficient space to raise a new building for vision research.

Teleophthalmology
A unique teleophthalmology project was started in villages in a 100 km radius of Chennai with a mobile bus offering primary eye care. It was inaugurated by the former president of India, Dr. APJ Abdul Kalam, in 2003. The key to the project was a mobile bus, designed by a team from Sankara Nethralaya with assistance from the Indian Space Research Organisation.

Sankara Nethralaya Women's Auxiliary (SWAN)
Registered as a public charitable trust in 1984, SWAN volunteers have served Sankara Nethralya. All medical and post operative needs of poor patients, including food and spectacles, are taken care by SWAN volunteers. This apart, SWAN volunteers assists patients in the hospital, help the Medical Records Department, Library, Patient service dept, organise conferences, events, maintain the STD booths, utility and coffee shop at the hospital premises.

In 2009, SWAN added another feather in its cap: 25 years of selfless service.

Awards and recognitions
 Sankara Nethralaya has won the Corporate Citizen Award in Economic Times Awards for Corporate Excellence 2007.
 Sankara Nethralaya was adjudged "Best Eye Hospital in India" by a survey conducted by Outlook magazine (July 2002).
 The Week (April 2005) and more recently by a survey conducted by The Week (April 2007)...
 Sankara Nethralaya received an award from NASSCOM for the Best IT Adoption in the Healthcare Sector. The function took place at Mumbai on 26 November 2008.

See also

 Healthcare in Chennai

References

External links
Official website

Eye hospitals in India
Hospitals in India
Hospitals in Tamil Nadu
Hospitals in West Bengal
Hospitals in Chennai
Hospitals in Kolkata
Hospital buildings completed in 1978
1978 establishments in Tamil Nadu
20th-century architecture in India